Gibasis oaxacana is species of flowering plants within the Gibasis genus, first described in 1972. It is endemic to the State of Oaxaca in southern Mexico.

References

oaxacana
Endemic flora of Mexico
Flora of Oaxaca
Plants described in 1972